Markos Markou (born August 12, 1949) is a retired Cypriot football striker.

References

1949 births
Living people
Cypriot footballers
Olympiakos Nicosia players
APOEL FC players
Cyprus international footballers
Association football forwards